Cobalt is an action side-scrolling video game developed by Oxeye Game Studio and published by Mojang Studios. It was released on 2 February 2016 for Microsoft Windows, Xbox 360 and the Xbox One consoles.

Gameplay

Game modes
Cobalt features a story mode, as well as 5 other arcade/multiplayer game modes:

Deathmatch: A type of the game mode where various weapons and throwables are spawned across the map, which are to be picked up. Players can play free-for-all deathmatch, or with teams. Up to 8 players can play in a multiplayer match.
Team Strike: At the beginning of each round, players buy one of six classes, which each have certain advantages and disadvantages. Players then play in 4 vs. 4 eliminations. As soon as a team is eliminated, a new round begins. They can play in their character's current condition, repair their character, or sell it to get a new class. 8 players can participate in a multiplayer match.
Plug Slam: Like deathmatch, various weapons are placed on the map. A plug is placed in the middle of the map. The goal is for the player to get the plug into the opponent's goal.
Survival: At the beginning of a wave, players buy equipment, then must survive attacks, occasionally receiving objectives. Once a wave is over, players have the ability to upgrade their equipment.
Challenge: These are time-driven challenges which test players' ability in speed and combat.
Speed: Speed challenges are time-based and require players to pass through all checkpoints until they get to the end. Obstacles may be present, such as enemies, turrets, and environmental hazards.
Combat: Combat challenges are also time-based and have targets that players must kill. Their score increases by performing actions like saving prisoners and taking out optional enemies.

Players play as the main character, known as Cobalt. Some key mechanics of the game include bullet time, rolling (to deflect bullets and/or increase speed), attacks, both ranged and melee, using various weapons of both kinds, which can deal damage and knock back throwables, all of which a player can combo together to produce an advanced level of play.

Development

Alpha
Cobalt was released in its alpha stage of development. Updates to subsequent versions of the game are free. The alpha version was initially only available for the Windows operating system. A macOS version was released on 27 June 2013, however the game was re-announced as an Xbox 360, Xbox One and Windows 10 exclusive at Gamescom 2014.

The alpha version's main goals are:
 Local multiplayer
 Introducing both the single-player and co-op Adventure mode
 Introducing the level editor

Beta
Additional features were planned for the beta stage including a fully working level editor (and multiple editors), in-game level sharing between players, as well as the macOS and Linux ports of the game. Of these, the editors and the macOS port have been released during the alpha stage.

The Beta was never officially released as the game left Alpha, and the game was instead launched directly into its Gold version.

Gold
The final version of the game includes tools for sharing user-generated content (on Steam), a complete story mode, and same computer co-op multiplayer. Unlike the alpha, the main game's engine is powered by Autodesk Stingray (as opposed to the in-house engine DaisyMoon).

Xbox port
The game was ported to the Xbox 360 and Xbox One by Fatshark.

Reception

Cobalt received "mixed or average" reviews, according to video game review aggregator Metacritic.

See also
 Cobalt WASD

References

External links
 

2016 video games
Action video games
Early access video games
Indie video games
Linux games
MacOS games
Mojang Studios
Multiplayer and single-player video games
Video games with Steam Workshop support
Video games developed in Sweden
Windows games
Xbox 360 games
Xbox One games